Jamie Freveletti is an American writer of thriller novels. Her first novel, Running from the Devil, was published in 2009 and won the 2010 Barry Award for best thriller and the 2010 International Thriller Writers Awards best first novel. In 2011 Freveletti was selected by the Robert Ludlum estate to write a novel in the Covert-One series. Freveletti has currently published four novels and a novella in her Emma Caldridge series and two novels in the Covert-One series.

Biography
Freveletti grew up in Addison, Illinois. After attending law school she moved to Geneva, Switzerland to study for a diploma in International Studies. Following her studies Freveletti started practicing as a trial attorney. Freveletti also holds a black belt in aikido and competes in ultramarathons. Freveletti's first thriller novel, Running from the Devil, was published in 2009 and featured the character Emma Caldridge. Running from the Devil won the 2010 Barry Award for best thriller and was named the best first novel at the 2010 International Thriller Writers Awards. The second novel in the Emma Caldridge series was released the following year and the third, The Ninth Day was released in 2011. In August 2011 it was announced that Freveletti had been selected by the Robert Ludlum Estate to write the next novel in the Covert-One series. It was released in 2012 entitled The Janus Reprisal. During 2012 Freveletti also published the fourth novel in the Emma Caldridge series and released the first of three parts in an Emma Caldridge novella. The following year her publisher released parts two and three of the novella which were entitled Gone and Run. In 2015 Freveletti's second novel in the Covert-One series, The Geneva Strategy, was released. Freveletti currently lives in Chicago with her family.

Bibliography

Novels and novellas

Short stories

References

External links
Official website

American thriller writers
American women novelists
Living people
People from Addison, Illinois
Year of birth missing (living people)
Barry Award winners
21st-century American women